Sumant Subramaniam (born 1993) is a Malaysian chess player. He was awarded the title of FIDE Master by FIDE in 2016.

Chess career
He qualified to play in the Chess World Cup 2021 where he was defeated 2-0 by Samuel Sevian in the first round.

References

External links 
 
 Sumant Subramaniam chess games at 365Chess.com

1993 births
Living people
Malaysian chess players
Date of birth missing (living people)
Place of birth missing (living people)
Chess FIDE Masters